Bryan William Stewart (born September 1985) is an English footballer

Youth graduate Bryan Stewart made his City debut in August 2003 voted youth team player of the year 03/04. In June 2006, he left the club when declining to sign a new contract in favour of a career outside of football 

Stewart re-joined York City on trial in August 2008 and played for the reserves in an 8–0 defeat to Scunthorpe United.

Notes

External links

1985 births
Living people
Footballers from Stockton-on-Tees
Footballers from County Durham
English footballers
Association football midfielders
York City F.C. players
English Football League players
National League (English football) players